The New Taipei City Government (NTPC) is the municipal government of New Taipei City, a special municipality in Taiwan. The New Taipei City Hall is located in Banqiao District.

History
The city government was originally established as Taipei County Government on 25 December 1945, shortly after the handover of Taiwan from Japan to the Republic of China in October 1945 and the Banqiao Township chosen as its county seat in 1947. On 25 December 2010, Taipei County was upgraded to a special municipality as New Taipei City, consisting of 29 districts with Banqiao District as the municipal seat and the county government was renamed New Taipei City Government.

Organizational structure

Operational departments
 Education Department
 Civil Affairs Department
 Finance Department
 Labor Affairs Department
 Land Administration Department
 Agriculture Department
 Environmental Protection Department
 Transportation Department
 Urban and Rural Development Department
 Legal Affairs Department
 Social Affairs Department
 Indigenous Peoples Department
 Public Works Department
 Cultural Affairs Department
 Economic Development Department
 Hakka Affairs Department
 Tourism and Travel Department
 Fire Department
 Water Resources Department
 Police Department
 Public Health Department
 Rapid Transit Systems Department
 Information Department

Administrative departments
 Secretariat
 Information Department
 Budget, Accounting and Statistics Office
 Personnel Office
 Civil Service Ethics Office
 Research, Development and Evaluation Commission

See also
 New Taipei City Hall
 New Taipei City Council

References

External links

 

1945 establishments in Taiwan
Government agencies established in 2010
Local governments of the Republic of China
Government of New Taipei